Partners is an American television sitcom that aired on CBS from September 24 to November 12, 2012, on Monday nights at 8:30 p.m., following the sitcom How I Met Your Mother. The series was created by Will & Grace creators Max Mutchnick and David Kohan, who also served as the show's executive producers and it stars Michael Urie, David Krumholtz, Sophia Bush, and Brandon Routh.

Premise
Although they could not be more different, Louis and Joe are lifelong friends and partners in an architecture firm. Their "bromance" is tested when Joe gets engaged to Ali and Louis is in a new relationship with Wyatt.

Cast and characters

Main
 David Krumholtz as Joe Goodman, an architect
 Michael Urie as Louis McManus, Joe's best friend and business partner
 Sophia Bush as Ali Landow, Joe's fiancée	
 Brandon Routh as Wyatt Plank, Louis's boyfriend

Recurring
 Tracy Vilar as Ro-Ro, Joe and Louis' secretary
 Jillian Bell as Renata, Ali's hapless cousin and assistant
 Randy Sklar and Jason Sklar as Jordy and Nate Blevins, twin architects who have a friendly rivalry with Joe and Louis

Production
CBS cancelled Partners on November 16, 2012, prior to the planned November 19 airing of episode 7, "Pretty Funny", and announced that the show would be immediately removed from the schedule. The show was replaced with reruns of Two and a Half Men and The Big Bang Theory, leaving seven filmed episodes unaired in the USA and Canada. Filming on the final episode concluded a week later, on November 21. Seven episodes remain unaired in the U.S., but all 13 episodes have been aired by South African channel M-Net, Indian channel Zee Café and by HBO Comedy in Bosnia and Herzegovina, Bulgaria, Croatia, the Czech Republic, Hungary, Kosovo, Macedonia, Montenegro, Poland, Romania, Serbia, Slovakia and Slovenia.

Within days, the show's page was removed from the CBS website and the show was removed from the People's Choice Awards online ballot for Favorite New TV Comedy.

Episodes

Reception
The show has been met with negative reviews with a collective score of 37/100 from Metacritic.

Critics have noted that the CBS show has many similarities to a 1995 Fox sitcom of the same name. Both shows had the same director, concept, characters with similar occupations, similar name for the main female lead, and even timeslot. In addition, Jeff Greenstein, one of the head writers of the Fox series who also worked on Will & Grace with Kohan and Mutchnick, has claimed they were big fans of the show.

Broadcast
Partners aired concurrently in Canada on City via simultaneous substitution of the CBS broadcast.

The complete series was shown on DSTV's M-Net in South Africa from November 2012.

It was later broadcast by HBO Comedy in Bosnia and Herzegovina, Bulgaria, Croatia, the Czech Republic, Hungary, Kosovo, Macedonia, Montenegro, Poland, Romania, Serbia, Slovakia, and Slovenia from March 2013, Zee Cafe in India from October 2013, and TVNZ's TV2 in New Zealand from November 27, 2013, late-night.

The Nine Network in Australia were going to air the series prior to cancellation for their late 2012 to early 2013 season, however delayed the complete series for burning off until December 30, 2013, late-night also airing on Thursdays. Also captioning was converted to teletext subtitling by AI Media, which are made available due to ACMA rules – unlike New Zealand and other countries that have very limited legislated broadcasting rules. The series was preempted during the first week of February 2014.

References

External links
 

2010s American LGBT-related comedy television series
2012 American television series debuts
2012 American television series endings
American LGBT-related sitcoms
CBS original programming
English-language television shows
Gay-related television shows
Television series by Warner Bros. Television Studios
Television shows set in New York City